This is a list of career statistics of Spanish professional tennis player Carla Suárez Navarro since her professional debut in 2003. Suárez Navarro has won two WTA singles titles and three doubles titles. Along with Garbiñe Muguruza, she also reached the final of the doubles tournament at the 2015 WTA Finals.

Performance timelines

Only main-draw results in WTA Tour, Grand Slam tournaments, Fed Cup/Billie Jean King Cup and Olympic Games are included in win–loss records.

Singles
Current after 2020–21 Billie Jean King Cup Finals.

Notes 

 The first Premier 5 event of the year has switched back and forth between the Dubai Tennis Championships and the Qatar Total Open since 2009. Dubai was classified as a Premier 5 event from 2009 to 2011 before being succeeded by Doha for the 2012–2014 period. In 2015, Dubai regained its Premier 5 status while Doha was demoted to Premier status.

 In 2014, the Toray Pan Pacific Open was downgraded to a Premier event and replaced by the Wuhan Open.

Doubles

Significant finals

WTA Finals finals

Doubles: 1 (1 runner-up)

WTA 1000 finals

Singles: 3 (1 title, 2 runners-up)

Doubles: 4 (4 runners-up)

WTA career finals

Singles: 11 (2 titles, 9 runners-up)

Doubles: 9 (3 titles, 6 runners-up)

ITF Finals

Singles: 11 (6 titles, 5 runner-ups)

Doubles: 7 (4 titles, 3 runner-ups)

WTA Tour career earnings
Current as of 3 November 2021

Grand Slam tournament seedings

Record against top 10 players

Top 10 wins

Notes

References

External links
 
 
 
 Carla Suárez Navarro at CoreTennis

Suarez Navarro, Carla